Lake County is a county located in the U.S. state of Indiana. In 2020, its population was 498,700, making it Indiana's second-most populous county. The county seat is Crown Point. The county is part of Northwest Indiana and the Chicago metropolitan area, and contains a mix of urban, suburban and rural areas. It is bordered on the north by Lake Michigan and contains a portion of the Indiana Dunes. It includes Marktown, Clayton Mark's planned worker community in East Chicago.

History

Early settlement
Originally inhabited by the Potawatomi and generations of indigenous ancestors, Lake County was established by European Americans on February 16, 1837. From 1832 to 1836 the area that was to become Lake County was part of La Porte County. From 1836 to 1837 it was part of Porter County. It was named for its location on Lake Michigan. The original county seat was Liverpool, but in 1840 Lake Court House, later renamed as Crown Point, was chosen.

Lake County's population grew slowly before the 1850s. Construction of railroads to link Chicago to the rest of the country, stimulated rapid development, and tens of thousands of settlers and immigrants bought land in the region. Small-scale industrialization began, but was primarily relegated to the northern coast of the county, where it could take advantage of the railroads along the coast and shipping on the Great Lakes. The 1900 Census gives a population of 37,892 residents.

Industrialization and immigration
Inland Steel Company established a plant in East Chicago in 1903 and U.S. Steel founded one in Gary in 1906; with industrial jobs the demand for labor associated with industrial jobs, the county's population exploded. Immigrants poured into the area from all over Central and Eastern Europe (there was also a smaller Mexican immigrant community). In addition, both black and white migrants came from many regions of the United States, particularly Appalachia and the South. Mostly rural blacks went north in the Great Migration, seeking both industrial jobs and escape from Jim Crow violence and disenfranchisement in the South.

By 1930, Lake County's population surpassed 260,000, with first- and second-generation Americans constituting a majority of the population. The second wave of the Ku Klux Klan gained a large following here in the 1920s, as it did for a time in the rest of Indiana. The KKK organized against the numerous European immigrants, who were mostly Catholic. While the steel industry reigned supreme, other industries also found the county to be an ideal location for cheap land and well-developed transportation networks, such as automobiles, oil, chemicals, consumer goods, food processing, and construction supply companies.

The Great Depression was devastating to Lake County, as it was to other areas with economies based on heavy industry. The Depression, combined with industrial strife, changing demographics, and unionization, caused a realignment of politics in Lake County. It became a stronghold of the Democratic Party; Lake County has supported the Democratic nominee for President in every election since 1932 (exceptions occurred in 1956 and 1972). Indiana's 1st congressional district has elected Democratic candidates in every election since 1930.

World War II restored prosperity, as industry revived to support the war effort. Good economic times continued into the 1970s. During this period, unions helped industrial workers gain middle-class wages. In addition to attracting refugees and immigrants from Europe, black Americans and Mexicans migrated here in the postwar period in even higher numbers than in the 1910-1930 period. As minority populations exploded in such industrial cities as East Chicago and Gary, racial tensions surfaced again. Following construction of state and federal highways, development of cheaper land provided newer housing to middle-class people who could afford it. Both whites and established black families moved out of the aging industrial cities.

Recent history
Lake County's population peaked at 546,000 in 1970. Severe industrial decline took place during the 1973-1991 period, brought on by foreign competition, new management philosophies that called for major workforce reductions, and productivity gains from technology. The decline was particularly intense in the steel industry: steel employment exceeded 60,000 in the 1960s, and declined progressively to just 18,000 by 2015. Lake County's population declined 13% to bottom out at 475,000 in 1990.

The industrial decline of the 1980s cast a long shadow over Lake County: the county did not regain the level of employment it had in 1980 until 1996, after which the employment level roughly flatlined. The county's economic output peaked in 1978, and has not since recovered, remaining 15-20% below the peak after adjusting for inflation. As prosperity declined, so did the immigration that powered the county's explosive population growth before 1950: per the 2000 census, only 5.3% of Lake County's residents were foreign-born, compared to over 11% for the United States as a whole.

The population recovered somewhat during the 1990s and 2000s, as the local economy adjusted. Suburban growth has also been driven by commuter populations of workers who are employed in Chicago and commute via expressways or the South Shore Line. In 2007, it was estimated that 44,000 workers commuted from Lake County, Indiana, to Chicago for work. The decline of industrial cities and growth of suburbs has been so sharp, that by 1990 a majority of the County's population lived outside of the four traditional industrial cities. Lake County still continues to struggle with urban decline and poverty, suburban sprawl and traffic jams, and a stagnating population.

Geography

The northern and southern portions of the county (north of U.S. 30 and south of Lowell) are mainly low and flat, except for a few sand ridges and dunes and were both once very marshy and had to be drained.

The central part of the county is higher and hillier. As you travel south from the low and relatively flat lake plain in the northern part of the county, the land gradually rises in elevation until the peak of the Valparaiso Moraine. From here the land descends south into the Kankakee Outwash Plain until the Kankakee River is reached.

National protected area
 Indiana Dunes National Park – also in LaPorte and Porter counties

Airports
 Gary/Chicago International Airport
 Griffith-Merrillville Airport

Major highways
Interstate 65 in Lake County is called the Casimir Pulaski Memorial Highway. Interstate 80/94/US 6 is the Frank Borman Expressway from the Illinois state line east to the Indiana Toll Road interchange in the eastern portion of the county. Interstate 94 has been referred to as the Chicago-Detroit Industrial Freeway. US 6 is part of the Grand Army of the Republic Highway. Broadway (Indiana 53) is also the Carolyn Mosby Memorial Highway. Indiana 51 is known for its entire length as the Adam Benjamin Memorial Highway. US 30 is part of the historic Lincoln Highway. US 12 from Gary eastward is part of Dunes Highway. Cline Avenue (Indiana 912) from US 12 north and westward is known as the Highway Construction Workers Memorial Highway.

Railroads
 Amtrak
 Canadian National Railway
 Chicago, Fort Wayne and Eastern Railroad
 Chicago South Shore and South Bend Railroad
 CSX Transportation
 Gary Railway
 Indiana Harbor Belt Railroad
 Norfolk Southern Railway
 South Shore Line

Adjacent counties

Municipalities

The municipalities in Lake County, and their populations as of the 2020 Census, are:

Cities

Towns

Census-designated places
 Lake Dalecarlia – 1,332
 Lakes of the Four Seasons – 3,936(7,091 including portion in Porter County)
 Shelby – 453

Unincorporated communities

 Ainsworth
 Belshaw
 Brunswick
 Creston
 Deep River
 Deer Creek
 Dinwiddie
 Green Acres
 Illinoi (partial)
 Klaasville
 Kreitzburg
 Leroy
 Liverpool
 New Elliott
 Orchard Grove
 Palmer
 Range Line
 Ross
 Southeast Grove

Townships
The 11 townships of Lake County, with their populations as of the 2020 Census, are:

 Calumet – 91,970
 Cedar Creek – 12,725
 Center – 38,630
 Eagle Creek – 1,719
 Hanover – 18,214
 Hobart – 40,652
 North – 156,686
 Ross – 48,529
 St. John – 68,972
 West Creek – 7,676
 Winfield – 12,927

Economy
Despite the decline of heavy industry, manufacturing was still the largest employment sector in Lake County in 2010 with over 45,000 workers employed, followed closely by healthcare and social assistance at 44,000 workers, public administration at 40,000 workers, retail trade at 37,000 workers, accommodation and food services at 25,000 workers, and construction at 15,000 workers.

Lake County's GDP in 2010 was measured at nearly $25 billion. Manufacturing was also the largest sector of the economy in economic terms, contributing over $5.8 billion to the county's GDP in 2010. It was followed by healthcare and social assistance at $2.6 billion, public administration at $2.5 billion, and retail trade at $1.9 billion. While Lake County's average income was approximately 24% higher than the national average in 1978, in 2010 Lake County had fallen significantly behind the United States as a whole, with average income being approximately 12.9% lower. The national average surpassed Lake County sometime around 1986.

Businesses with the largest number of employees in the county are:

 Americall Group, Inc. – Hobart
 Ameristar Casino – East Chicago
 ArcelorMittal – East Chicago
 BP Whiting Refinery – Whiting
 Canadian National Railway – Whiting
 Cargill – Hammond
 Community Hospital – Munster
 Franciscan Alliance, Inc. – locations throughout the region
 Franciscan Health Hammond – Hammond
 Horseshoe Casino – Hammond
 Majestic Star Casino – Gary
 Methodist Hospitals Northlake Campus – Merrillville
 NiSource  – Merrillville
 Radisson Hotel at Star Plaza – Merrillville (closed)
 St. Catherine Hospital – East Chicago
 St. Mary Medical Center – Hobart
 Times Media Company – Munster
 Unilever – Whiting
 U.S. Steel Gary Works – Gary

Education

Public school districts
The administration of public schools in Lake County is divided among 16 corporations and governing bodies, more than any other Indiana county.
 Crown Point Community School Corporation – Center and Winfield townships
 Gary Community School Corporation – City of Gary
 Griffith Public Schools – Town of Griffith
 Hanover Community School Corporation – Hanover Township
 Lake Central School Corporation – St. John Township
 Lake Ridge Schools Corporation – unincorporated Calumet Township
 Lake Station Community Schools – City of Lake Station
 Merrillville Community School Corporation – Ross Township
 River Forest Community School Corporation – Town of New Chicago and some portions of adjacent communities
 School City of East Chicago – City of East Chicago
 School City of Hammond – City of Hammond
 School City of Hobart – City of Hobart within Hobart Township
 School City of Whiting – City of Whiting
 School Town of Highland – Town of Highland
 School Town of Munster – Town of Munster
 Tri-Creek School Corporation – Cedar Creek, Eagle Creek and West Creek townships

Private schools
Elementary and secondary schools operated by the Diocese of Gary:

 Andrean High School, Merrillville (9–12)
 Aquinas School at St. Andrew's, Merrillville (PK–8)
 Bishop Noll Institute, Hammond (9–12)
 Our Lady of Grace, Highland (PK–8)
 St. Casimir, Hammond (PK–8)
 St. John Bosco, Hammond (PK–8)
 St. John the Baptist, Whiting (PK–8)
 St. John the Evangelist, St. John (PK–8)
 St. Mary, Crown Point (PK–8)
 St. Mary, Griffith (PK–8)
 St. Michael, Schererville (PK–8)
 St. Stanislaus, East Chicago (PK–8)
 St. Thomas More, Munster (PK–8)
 

Other parochial and private schools:
 St. Paul's Lutheran School, Munster (PK–8)
 Trinity Lutheran School, Crown Point (PK–8)
 Trinity Lutheran School, Hobart (PK–8)

Colleges and universities

 Calumet College of St. Joseph
 Hyles–Anderson College
 Indiana University Northwest
 Ivy Tech Community College
 Purdue University Northwest
 University of Phoenix

Public libraries
The county is served by seven different public library systems:
 Crown Point Community Library has its main location with a branch in Winfield.
 East Chicago Public Library has its main location and the Robart A. Pastrick branch.
 Gary Public Library has its main location, the Du Bois Library, as well as the Brunswick, Kennedy and Woodson branches.
 Hammond Public Library
 Lake County Public Library has its main location in Merrillville as well as Cedar Lake, Dyer-Schererville, Griffith-Calumet Township, Highland, Hobart, Lake Station-New Chicago, Munster and St. John branches.
 Lowell Public Library has its main location with branches in Schneider and Shelby.
 Whiting Public Library

Hospitals
 Community Hospital, Munster – 458 beds
 Community Stroke and Rehabilitation Center - 40 beds [31]
 Franciscan Health Dyer, Dyer – 198 beds
 Franciscan Health Hammond, Hammond – 215 beds
 Franciscan Health Munster, Munster – 63 beds
 Methodist Hospitals – 536 beds
 Northlake Campus, Gary
 Southlake Campus, Merrillville
 St. Catherine Hospital, East Chicago – 189 beds
 St. Mary Medical Center, Hobart – 215 beds

Media
The Times, based in Munster, is the largest daily newspaper in Lake County and Northwest Indiana and the second largest in the state. Lake County is also served by the Post-Tribune, a daily newspaper based in Merrillville.

Lakeshore Public Television operates WYIN-TV Gary on channel 56 and is the local PBS station in the Chicago television market.

These eight broadcast radio stations serve Lake County and are part of the Chicago market:

 WJOB (1230 AM) – Hammond
 WWCA (1270 AM) – Gary
 WLTH (1370 AM) – Gary
 WLPR (89.1 FM) – Lowell
 WRTW (90.5 FM) – Crown Point
 WPWX (92.3 FM) – Hammond
 WXRD (103.9 FM) – Crown Point
 WZVN (107.1 FM) – Lowell

Climate and weather

Temperatures at or below  occur on average 11 days annually and exceed  degrees on 14 days. In winter, lake-effect snow increases snowfall totals compared to the areas to the west. In spring and early summer, the immediate shoreline areas sometimes experience lake-breeze that can drop temperatures by several degrees compared to areas further inland. In summer, thunderstorms are common, occurring an average 40–50 days every year, and on about 13 days, these thunderstorms produce severe winds.

Government

The county government is a constitutional body, and is granted specific powers by the Constitution of Indiana, and by the Indiana Code.

County Council: The county council is the legislative branch of the county government and controls all the spending and revenue collection in the county. Representatives are elected from county districts. The council members serve four-year terms. They are responsible for setting salaries, the annual budget, and special spending. The council also has limited authority to impose local taxes, in the form of an income and property tax that is subject to state level approval, excise taxes, and service taxes.

Board of Commissioners: The executive body of the county is made of a board of commissioners. The commissioners are elected county-wide, in staggered terms, and each serves a four-year term. One of the commissioners, typically the most senior, serves as president. The commissioners are charged with executing the acts legislated by the council, collecting revenue, and managing the day-to-day functions of the county government.

Court: The county maintains a small claims court that can handle some civil cases. The judge on the court is elected to a term of four years and must be a member of the Indiana Bar Association. The judge is assisted by a constable who is also elected to a four-year term. In some cases, court decisions can be appealed to the state level circuit court.

County Officials: The county has several other elected offices, including sheriff, coroner, auditor, treasurer, recorder, surveyor, and circuit court clerk Each of these elected officers serves a term of four years and oversees a different part of county government. Members elected to county government positions are required to declare party affiliations and to be residents of the county.

County elected officials

Board of Commissioners:
 Kyle W. Allen, Sr. (D, 1st)†
 Jerry J. Tippy (R, 2nd)
 Michael C. Repay (D, 3rd)

County Council:
 David Hamm (D, 1st)
 Elsie Brown-Franklin (D, 2nd)
 Charlie Brown (D, 3rd)
 Daniel E. Dernulc (R, 4th)
 Christine Cid (D, 5th)
 Ted F. Bilski (D, 6th)†
 Christian J. Jorgensen (R, 7th)

Elected Officials:
 Assessor: LaTonya Spearman (D)
 Auditor: John E. Petalas (D)
 Clerk: Lorenzo Arredondo (D)
 Coroner: Merrilee D. Frey (D)
 Prosecutor: Bernard A. Carter (D)
 Recorder: Michael B. Brown (D)
 Sheriff: Oscar Martinez, Jr. (D)
 Surveyor: Bill Emerson, Jr. (D)
 Treasurer: Peggy Holinga Katona (D)

† President

Politics
While the state of Indiana is strongly Republican, having voted Republican in every election since 1964 (except in 2008), Lake County has long been a Democratic stronghold, giving pluralities or majorities to Democrats in every Presidential election since 1932 with the exceptions of 1956 and 1972. Like the rest of the Rust Belt, however, Lake County has recently trended Republican, with Donald Trump scoring the highest percentage of the vote since 1988 in the 2020 election.

Lake is part of Indiana's 1st congressional district, which is held by Democrat Frank J. Mrvan. In the State Senate, Lake is part of the 1st, 2nd, 3rd and 6th districts, which are held by three Democrats and one Republican. In the Indiana House of Representatives, Lake is part of the 1st, 2nd, 3rd, 11th, 12th, 14th, 15th and 19th districts, which are held by four Democrats and four Republicans.

2008 presidential primary
In the 2008 Democratic presidential primary on May 6, 2008, Lake County was one of the last counties to report results. Lake County had reported no results at 11 p.m. ET, and at midnight ET, only 28% of Lake County's vote had been reported. A large number of absentee ballots and a record turnout delayed the tallies, and polls closed an hour later than much of the state because Lake County is in the Central Time Zone. Early returns showed Senator Barack Obama leading by a potentially lead-changing margin, leaving the race between Senator Hillary Clinton and Obama "too close to call" until final tallies were reported.

Crime

The NWI Times reported that over 800 registered sex offenders live in Lake and Porter Counties of Indiana in 2021.

Culture and contemporary life

Entertainment and the arts

 Northwest Indiana Symphony Orchestra, concerts held at Living Hope Church – Merrillville
 Theatre at the Center, located at the Center for Visual and Performing Arts – Munster

Major attractions

 Ameristar Casino – East Chicago
 Horseshoe Casino – Hammond
 Majestic Star Casino – Gary
 Majestic Star Casino II – Gary
 Pierogi Fest – Whiting
 Southlake Mall – Hobart
 Three Floyds Brewing – Munster

Professional sports teams
 Gary SouthShore RailCats, an American Association professional baseball team, play their games at U.S. Steel Yard in Gary.

Recreation

List of parks and recreational facilities – Lake County Parks and Recreation

List of recreational facilities – Indiana Dunes National Park

Demographics

As of the 2010 United States Census, there were 496,005 people, 188,157 households, and 127,647 families residing in the county. The racial makeup of the county was 64.4% white, 25.9% black or African American, 1.2% Asian, 0.3% American Indian, 5.8% from other races, and 2.4% from two or more races. Those of Hispanic or Latino origin made up 16.7% of the population. In terms of ancestry, 16.1% were German, 11.1% were Irish, 9.6% were Polish, 5.4% were English, and 3.7% were American.

Of the 188,157 households, 34.3% had children under the age of 18 living with them, 44.7% were married couples living together, 17.4% had a female householder with no husband present, 32.2% were non-families, and 27.4% of all households were made up of individuals. The average household size was 2.60 and the average family size was 3.19. The median age was 37.4 years.

The median income for a household in the county was $47,697 and the median income for a family was $58,931. Males had a median income of $50,137 versus $33,264 for females. The per capita income for the county was $23,142. About 12.2% of families and 16.1% of the population were below the poverty line, including 25.3% of those under age 18 and 8.4% of those age 65 or over.

See also
 Lake County Indiana Sheriff's Department
 List of public art in Lake County, Indiana
 National Register of Historic Places listings in Lake County, Indiana

Bibliography

Notes

References

External links
 Lake County official website
 Lake County Parks
 South Shore Convention & Visitors Authority

 
Indiana counties
1837 establishments in Indiana
Populated places established in 1837
Lake County, Indiana
Northwest Indiana
Sundown towns in Indiana